Richard Hunter may refer to:

 Richard C. Hunter (1884–1941), American politician
 Richard L. Hunter (born 1953), Regius Professor of Greek at Cambridge University
 Richard Hunter (harmonica), son of Evan Hunter, author and harmonica composer/player
 Richard S. Hunter (1909–1991), inventor of the Lab color space
 Rick Hunter, fictional character
 Richard Hunter (footballer), Scottish footballer for St Mirren, Burnley, and the national team
 Dick Hunter, American football player/coach
 Richard Alfred Hunter (1923–1981), German physician

See also
 Rick Hunter (disambiguation)